A calculator character set is a character encoding scheme for a calculator.

Examples include:

Casio calculator character sets, character sets used by Casio calculators
Hewlett-Packard calculator character sets, character sets used by Hewlett-Packard calculators
Sharp calculator character sets, character sets used by Sharp calculators
Texas Instruments calculator character sets, character sets used by Texas Instruments calculators